Fashionably Late is the second studio album by American rock band Falling in Reverse. Production for the album took place following the release of their debut album, The Drug in Me Is You in 2011.  It is the only album to feature bassist Ron Ficarro, who would later be replaced by Max Green. The album was streamed through Epitaph Records' YouTube channel on June 12. Fashionably Late was released on June 18, 2013.

Background
Since early 2012, vocalist Ronnie Radke had already announced a second album was underway following the 2011 release of their debut album, The Drug in Me Is You. He  had been talking about the album briefly, stating on Twitter that, "[people] don't understand how many light years my next album is from the last one". He and new bandmate Ron Ficarro tweeted pictures of them in the studio with Ryan Ogren working on some new music. Ronnie said a little bit about the new album to Marshal Music News; "The last record was so vengeful and bitter and spiteful - so everyone is wondering what I'm gonna sing about next. And I'm just not quite ready to let people know. I'm sorry. When people hear the new stuff though I promise you they will lose their mind... We're demoing new songs right now, as we speak, and I'm telling you, people are seriously gonna lose their mind." During their performance at Dirt Fest 2012 in Birch Run, Michigan, Ronnie announced to the crowd that it would be their last show before returning to the studio to dedicate themselves full-time to the creation of the band's second album. Ronnie also said in an interview that they would be in the studio late 2012 with demos already and hoping for an early 2013 release.

The band went through late 2012 and early 2013 with no mention of the album at all. Finally, in issue number 1442 of Kerrang! magazine, Ronnie Radke announced in an interview that "The record's finished! That's what we did after the Warped Tour. We just didn't tell anybody!" He also said "[it will be released] early next year [summer 2013]!" On May 7, the band released the first single and music video, "Alone", from the album. The title, Fashionably Late, was officially announced along with the cover and a June 18, 2013 release date, with preorders for the album beginning the same day.

Another song on the album, "Game Over" is a pop punk song that includes video game sound effects within it, including the 1-Up sound effect from the Super Mario Bros. games, and also mentions the Konami Code.

Radke spoke about the album and the addition of new sounds, including hip-hop and electronic elements, saying that, "My dad raised me on metal, but my first serious love was hip-hop," Ronnie explains. "When I heard Dr. Dre's The Chronic, that's when I fell in love. I didn't know what the hell they were talking about, the beats were intertwined, and it came inside of me and took me over. When we added hip-hop elements I was thinking, 'Should I do this? This sounds crazy! Are people going to like this?'" He also expressed satisfaction with the album over Falling in Reverse's debut album as well as his first album with Escape the Fate, stating, "...I've never been so proud of something. The final product... is the best work I've ever done."

The album is also the first that drummer, Ryan Seaman and bassist, Ron Ficarro fully contributed to and recorded with the band.

The deluxe edition of the album includes three bonus tracks, an expanded album booklet, and a double-sided band poster.

Singles and promotion
The first single from the album, "Alone", was released on May 7, 2013. The song features a mix of their previous metalcore sound with elements of rap and electronic music. Radke stated he was inspired by Dr. Dre and his album The Chronic, and plans to mix other songs on the album with similar sounds. The first single was described by Zoiks! Online as, "Blending big radio beats with moshpit inducing riffage, the track addresses Ronnie's critics head-on." In a press statement, Radke stated that "Alone" was, "... Everything I've ever wanted to say to all these Twitter followers that talk shit... [and] I wanted to let everyone that dedicates their lives to just one genre of music know why they are so unhappy." The music video, released the same day, portrayed Radke performing  on an airport runway with a Ferrari driving beside him. The song was panned by critics and fans alike. Most discussed the new rap style and lyrics while others discussed the use of computer effects and auto-tune.

The second single, "Fashionably Late", was released on May 20, 2013. The song featured a sound reminiscent of the first Falling in Reverse album, The Drug in Me Is You, and received much more positive reviews than "Alone" from both critics and fans.

To promote the album, Falling in Reverse went on tour from May to July 2013, including the 2013 Vans Warped Tour. On May 13, Falling in Reverse announced on Twitter that the band had cancelled tour dates due to lead singer Radke expecting the birth of his first child with Crissy Henderson. Falling in Reverse officially stated on Facebook: "Our apologies but Falling in Reverse has to cancel the rest of the dates scheduled in May. Ronnie will not be able to appear, as his girlfriend is about to give birth to their first child and he needs to be by her side. Thanks for your understanding. See you soon." They also canceled the dates to play Warped Tour. The tour released the following statement regarding the band's decision: "Falling in Reverse are withdrawing from performing on this summer's Warped Tour. Lead singer Ronnie Radke's fiancé is pregnant with their first child who is due shortly. Radke has made the decision that it's important to be home with his newborn this summer. The band offers sincere apologies to all of their fans who purchased tickets."

On May 30, 2013, another song was released titled "Born to Lead". Like "Fashionably Late", it has a sound reminiscent of the band's first album, The Drug in Me Is You, but with a more hardcore edge. Fans and critics have compared the song to their previous song "Goodbye Graceful" with good reviews. Whether the song is a single or not is yet to be confirmed.

On June 12, Epitaph Records uploaded the entire album to their YouTube channel, five days before the album's official release.

Following the cancellation of dates for their tour and Warped Tour, Falling in Reverse celebrated the release of Fashionably Late with a special performance at the Roxy in West Hollywood, California, on June 18, 2013. The set of one hour was broadcast online and presented by Hot Topic.

Commercial performance
Despite a negative response to the album, it opened at number 17 on the Billboard 200, selling around 20,000 copies in its first week of release. This is slightly over a thousand more copies than their previous effort, The Drug in Me Is You, which sold 18,000 copies in its first week and charted just 2 spots lower than Fashionably Late, at #19.  On the Billboard charts, Fashionably Late charted at number two on the Top Hard Rock Albums chart, number four on the Modern Rock Albums and Top Rock Albums charts, number three on the Top Independent Albums chart, and number 18 on the Top Digital Albums chart, for a total of six appearances on the US Billboard charts, including the Billboard 200.   The album has sold 105,000 copies in the united States as of February 2015.

Internationally, the album charted in the United Kingdom, peaking at number 75 on the national chart, as well as number 6 on the UK Top 40 Rock Albums chart. The album also peaked at number 20 on the Australian ARIA Albums Chart.

Critical reception

Fashionably Late received generally negative reviews based on five critics as aggregated by Metacritic. Some criticized the addition of rap into the album, stating that it did not fit, while others supported the new rap style. Others thought that the album was a mess, going from post-hardcore, to metalcore, to rap, to dubstep, to country. Other critics have expressed their distaste for the Nintendo-like sounds, repetitive sounds, song patterns, and use of sound effects across the album, as well as the addition of Auto-Tune.

Kerrang! magazine teased in their review of the album by saying "K! tries to decide if Falling in Reverse's new album is genius or guff (to be honest we're still not sure!)." They went on to say that this album broke their score system, because neither 1/5 nor 5/5 would have done the album justice. They gave it an overall rating of "Fuck Knows".

Infectious Magazine wrote a positive review about the album, they said "Combing a motley mixture of metalcore, pop, rap, and dubstep, Falling in Reverse deserves an A in originality. Some songs like 'Born to Lead', 'Self Destruct Personality', and 'Fuck the Rest' are more true to classic form: screaming intros, shredding guitar solos, and a general 'rock and roll' attitude. They are catchy, with enough musical toughness to satisfy the alternative cravings." Las Vegas Weekly had mixed review about the album, they said "Fashionably Late, which augments the band's familiar metalcore-with-a-pop-heart with glitchy electronic flourishes, hip-hop swagger, country-influenced instrumentation and, on 'Keep Holding On', piano and strings. Some of these musical progressions work surprisingly well (and Radke is actually a decent rapper), but Fashionably Lates weaker moments—the bratty, misogynistic electro-pop chant 'Bad Girls Club', constant references to Twitter and the awkward video game metaphors and sound effects on 'Game Over'—are cringe-inducing." Allmusic said that "Falling in Reverse deserve credit for their musical versatility" and highlighted to the tracks "Rolling Stone", "Fashionably Late", "Born to Lead" and "Drifter".

Track listing

Personnel
Falling in Reverse 
Ronnie Radke – lead vocals, piano, songwriter
Jacky Vincent – lead guitar, backing vocals
Derek Jones – rhythm guitar, backing vocals
Ryan Seaman – drums, percussion, backing vocals
Ron Ficarro – bass guitar, backing vocals

Additional musicians 
Rusty Cooley -guitar solo on "Born To Lead"
Omar Espinosa - additional writing
Max Green - bass guitar, backing vocals on "She's a Rebel"
Production
Michael 'Elvis' Baskette – producer
Ryan Ogren – additional production, engineer, producer, programming, strings, synthesizer
Chris Lord-Alge – mixing
Pete Rutcho – mixing
Ted Jensen – mastering

Charts

Release history

References

External links
Official band website

2013 albums
Epitaph Records albums
Falling in Reverse albums
Albums produced by Michael Baskette
Post-hardcore albums
Pop punk albums
Rapcore albums
Metalcore albums